Celia Daisy Morna Haggard (born 1978) is a British actress and writer. She is known for her roles in the BBC sitcoms Uncle and Episodes. Haggard stars in BBC Three’s comedy-drama, Back to Life, which she also created and co-wrote with Laura Solon. Since 2020, she has appeared alongside Martin Freeman as Ally in the FX series Breeders, a role for which she was nominated for 
the BAFTA Television Award for Best Female Comedy Performance.

Career
In 1996, Haggard made her acting debut in an episode of ITV crime drama, The Ruth Rendell Mysteries. The episode was directed by her father, and during the auditions, the producer stated that he wanted to audition Daisy, despite opposition from her father who did not want his daughter to take up the life of an actor.

Haggard later graduated from the London Academy of Music and Dramatic Art. She appeared in the BBC Three sketch show Man Stroke Woman, and in the Channel 4 sitcom Green Wing as Emmy. She also made an appearance in an episode of Peep Show, playing a nurse, and in the BBC Two comedy Psychoville by Reece Shearsmith and Steve Pemberton.

In the 2008 adaptation of Sense and Sensibility, Haggard portrayed the role of Miss Steele, the sister of Lucy Steele. In 2009, she played Donna Mitchell in an episode of the BBC crime drama Ashes to Ashes.

Haggard was also the voice of the Ministry Lift in Harry Potter and the Order of the Phoenix and Harry Potter and the Deathly Hallows – Part 1.  In 2010, she appeared in the CBC television film Abroad, playing Poppy Young.

Haggard played Sophie in the Doctor Who episode "The Lodger", a role she reprised in "Closing Time".

In 2010, Haggard starred in the independent British film Honeymooner. In 2012, she starred in the short film Tooty's Wedding, which was later screened at the 2012 Sundance Film Festival.  In 2011, she began appearing in the BBC/Showtime comedy Episodes. She portrayed the role of Myra Licht until the series ended in 2017.

Haggard also appeared on the stage, including at the National Theatre and as the title character in Gina Gionfriddo's play Becky Shaw at the Almeida Theatre.

In July 2012, Sky One began airing the series Parents, in which Haggard played the role of Chrissie.

In 2013, she co-starred with Rose Byrne in the British romantic comedy I Give It a Year as Helen. In 2014, she was cast as Sam in the BBC comedy Uncle. In 2016, she appeared in "Nosedive", an episode of the anthology series Black Mirror. In 2017, she appeared in the premiere production of Consent at the Royal National Theatre, London.

In April 2019, Haggard began playing the lead role of Miri Matteson in BBC Three sitcom Back to Life. The first series, consisting of six episodes, premiered on 15 April 2019 and was followed by a second series in 2021. She also co-wrote and created the series. In 2020 Haggard appeared in the comedy-drama Breeders as Ally.

Personal life
Haggard is the daughter of the film director Piers Haggard (1939–2023) and his wife Anna Sklovsky. She was raised and educated in Dulwich, South London, where she attended James Allen's Girls' School. Her grandfather was the actor Stephen Haggard, and her great-great-great-uncle was the author Sir Henry Rider Haggard.

Filmography

Film

Television

References

External links

1978 births
Living people
Alumni of the London Academy of Music and Dramatic Art
English film actresses
English television actresses
People educated at James Allen's Girls' School
Haggard family